The 1989–90 season saw Hibernian compete in the Scottish Premier Division, in which they finished 7th. They also competed in the Scottish Cup, where they reached the fifth round, the Scottish League Cup, where they were eliminated in the fourth round, and the UEFA Cup, in which they were eliminated in the second round.

Scottish Premier Division

Final League table

Scottish League Cup

UEFA Cup

Scottish Cup

See also
List of Hibernian F.C. seasons

References

External links
Hibernian 1989/1990 results and fixtures, Soccerbase

Hibernian F.C. seasons
Hibernian